The 2009 NCAA Division I women's basketball tournament commenced 21 March 2009 and concluded 7 April 2009 when the University of Connecticut Huskies defeated the Louisville Cardinals 76–54.

As of 2022, this tournament remains the last time that all four 1 seeds did not reach at least the Sweet Sixteen.

Subregionals

Once again, the system is the same as the Division I men's basketball tournament, with the exception that only 64 teams went and there was no play-in game. Automatic bids were secured by 31 conference champions and 33 at-large bids.

The subregionals, which used the "pod system", keeping most teams either at or close to the home cities, was held from 21 March to 24 at sixteen sites. The following were chosen in July 2006, prior to the re-expansion of the subregional sites from eight to sixteen:

The Pit, Albuquerque, New Mexico (Host: University of New Mexico)
Pete Maravich Assembly Center, Baton Rouge, Louisiana (Host: Louisiana State University)
Nationwide Arena, Columbus, Ohio (Host: The Ohio State University)
Comcast Center, College Park, Maryland (Host: University of Maryland, College Park)
Arena at Gwinnett Center, Duluth, Georgia (Host: University of Georgia)
United Spirit Arena, Lubbock, Texas (Host: Texas Tech University)
Galen Center, Los Angeles (Host: University of Southern California)
Louis Brown Athletic Center, Piscataway, New Jersey (Host: Rutgers University)

As per the return to the 16-site subregional format, the following sites were added in 2008:

E. A. Diddle Arena, Bowling Green, Kentucky (Host: Western Kentucky University)
Jack Breslin Student Events Center, East Lansing, Michigan (Host: Michigan State University)
Carver–Hawkeye Arena, Iowa City, Iowa (Host: University of Iowa)
Edmund P. Joyce Center, South Bend, Indiana (Host: University of Notre Dame)
Bank of America Arena at Hec Edmundson Pavilion, Seattle (Host: University of Washington)
Cox Arena, San Diego (Host: San Diego State University)
Harry A. Gampel Pavilion, Storrs, Connecticut (Host: University of Connecticut)
McKenzie Arena, Chattanooga, Tennessee (Host: University of Tennessee at Chattanooga)

Regionals

The regionals, held in the city rather than the geographic area as a practice that has been used since 2005, were held there from 28 March to 31 at these sites:

Trenton Regional: Sovereign Bank Arena, Trenton, New Jersey (Hosts: Metro Atlantic Athletic Conference and Rider University).
Raleigh Regional: RBC Center, Raleigh, North Carolina (Host: North Carolina State University).
Oklahoma City Regional: Ford Center, Oklahoma City (Host: Big 12 Conference).
Berkeley Regional: Haas Pavilion, Berkeley, California (Hosts: University of California, Berkeley and Pac-10 Conference).

The regional winners advanced to the Final Four, held 5 and 7 April 2009 at the Scottrade Center, in St. Louis, Missouri, hosted by the Missouri Valley Conference.

Tournament records
 Three-pointers—Iowa State hit 16 three-point field goals in a first-round game against East Tennessee State, tied for the most number of three-point shots completed in an NCAA Tournament game.
 Three-pointers—South Dakota State hit 16 three-point field goals in a first-round game against TCU, tied for the most number of three-point shots completed in an NCAA Tournament game.
 Three-pointers—Connecticut hit 47 three-point field goals, tied for the most number of three-point shots completed in an NCAA Tournament.

Qualifying teams – automatic
Sixty-four teams were selected to participate in the 2009 NCAA Tournament. Thirty-one conferences were eligible for an automatic bid to the 2009 NCAA tournament.

Qualifying teams – at-large
Thirty-three additional teams were selected to complete the sixty-four invitations.

Tournament seeds

Bids by conference
Thirty-one conferences earned an automatic bid. In twenty-two cases, the automatic bid was the only representative from the conference. Thirty-three additional at-large teams were selected from nine of the conferences.

Bids by state

The sixty-four teams came from thirty-two states. Texas had the most teams with six bids. Eighteen states did not have any teams receiving bids.

Game summaries

Berkeley Region

First round
Second seeded Stanford easily beat the 15th seeded Gauchos of UC Santa Barbara behind a double-double by Jayne Appel. Third seeded Ohio State beat Sacred Heart by 14 points, but led by only two well into the second half. Freshman guard Samantha Prahalis scored 23 to help lead the Buckeyes to victory. 
Tenth seeded San Diego State upset seventh seeded DePaul behind Jene Morris's career tying 35 points. Eleventh seed Mississippi State used 21 of 22 free throw shooting to upset the sixth seeded Texas Longhorns. Middle Tennessee's Alysha Clark, the nations D1 scoring leader, scored 34 points, but it wasn't enough to defeat ninth seeded Michigan State, who broke a late tie and held on to win by one point. One seeded Duke easily disposed of sixteen seeded Austin Peay. Fourth seeded Iowa State tied an NCAA tournament record with 16 three-point goals in an easy win over thirteen seed East Tennessee State.
 
Twelfth seeded Ball State upset defending national champion Tennessee, which had never lost an opening game in the tournament before. Tennessee has been in every one of the 29 NCAA Tournaments, and prior to this year, had never failed to make the Sweet Sixteen.

Second round
Third seeded Ohio State narrowly defeated eleventh seeded Mississippi State 64–58. OSU held MSU scoreless for the last 6:43 of the game. Second seeded Stanford beat San Diego State by 28, but the game was tied 8 minutes into the game. Stanford's Nneka Ogwumike had career highs of 27 points and 13 rebounds.

Ninth seeded Michigan State upsets top-seeded Duke on the home floor of Michigan State, in a match up between Duke head coach Joanne P. McCallie and her former team. Michigan State shot under 40% from the floor, but held Duke to under 27%. Twelfth seeded Ball State stayed with Iowa State for 30 minutes, but couldn't maintain the pace. Iowa State extended a four-point lead to win 71–57.

Regional semifinals (Sweet Sixteen)
Fourth seeded Iowa State beat ninth seeded Michigan State by a single point. MSU had a seven-point lead with 1:26 to go, but the Cyclones scored the final eight points of the game. They took the lead on a three-point shot by Alison Lacey for three of her 29 points. The Spartans had a chance to retake the lead, but missed their last three shots.

Two seed Stanford beat Ohio State behind Jayne Appel's double-double. OSU freshman Samantha Prahalis scored 19, but it wasn't enough to overcome the Cardinal shooting.

Regional final (Elite Eight)
Two seed Stanford easily beat four seed Iowa State behind Jayne Appel's 46 points. Jayne's 46 points sets a new school record and places her in the NCAA Tournament record book with the third highest point total in NCAA tournament history. Appel's 27 first half points exceeded the first half total for Iowa State.

Oklahoma City Region

First round
Third seeded North Carolina beat Fourteenth seeded Central Florida. UNC had a 14-point lead with 30 seconds left in the game, but UCF scored the final nine points of the game to make the final margin five points. Second seeded Auburn easily beat fifteen seed Lehigh, behind DeWanna Bonner's 26 points. Sixth seeded Purdue beat eleventh seeded Charlotte to win their twelfth consecutive first-round game. Fourth seeded Pittsburgh beat thirteenth seeded Montana behind Shavonte Zellous's 31 points. Twelfth seeded Gonzaga upset fifth seed Xavier, giving the Bulldogs their first ever NCAA Tournament win. Seventh seeded Rutgers beat Virginia Commonwealth to spoil VCU's NCAA Tournament debut. Top seeded Oklahoma struggled early, but ended up winning easily over Prairie View A&M. Ninth seeded Georgia Tech, playing without leading scorer Alex Montgomery, beat eighth seeded Iowa.

Second round
Seventh seeded Rutgers upsets second seeded Auburn. Playing on their home court, the Scarlet Knights scored the first nine points and lead 13–2 at the first media timeout. Rutgers held Auburn to 29% shooting and ended the game with a 28-point margin.

Fourth seeded Pittsburgh and twelfth seeded Gonzaga were tied at halftime, and with three and a half minutes to go in the game, but the Panthers outscored the Bulldogs in the final minutes to win by five.

Sixth seeded Purdue upsets third seeded North Carolina. Purdue had lost its last three games to UNC, but hit 57% of the field goals to win by fifteen.

Top seeded Oklahoma held Georgia Tech to 27% shooting in a win that advanced the Sooners to a Sweet Sixteen game in Oklahoma City.

Regional semifinals (Sweet Sixteen)
Sixth seeded Purdue holds off a determined Rutgers team. The Scarlet Knights fell behind early but came back to within two with less than two minutes remaining. Purdue shot 55% in the first half, ending with over 52% shooting.

Top seeded Oklahoma beat fourth seed Pittsburgh. Whitney Hand had a career-high 22 points, which helped overcome foul trouble for Courtney Paris. All five Sooner starters scored in double digits.

Regional final (Elite Eight)
Oklahoma beat Purdue to advance to their second ever Final Four. Courtney Paris had 19 points, 13 rebounds and six blocks, while Danielle Robinson scored 23 points to lead the team over the Boilermakers. Purdue had three players in double-figures, led by Lindsay Wisdom-Hylton with 20, but it wasn't enough.

Raleigh Region

First round
Fourth seeded Vanderbilt beat Western Carolina. Fifth seeded Kansas State beat Drexel. Shalee Lehning tied a career high with 13 assists. Seventh seeded South Dakota State tied an NCAA record with 16 three-point goals to help beat the Horned Frogs of TCU. Ninth seed Utah overwhelmed Villanova, winning by 30. Top seeded Maryland easily beat Dartmouth. Kristi Toliver had as many points at halftime (23) as Dartmouth. Sixth-seeded LSU beats Wisconsin-Green Bay behind Allison Hightower's career-best 26 points.

Second seeded Baylor needed overtime to prevail against fifteen seed UTSA. Head coach Kim Mulkey was not at the game, having been hospitalized earlier in the day due to a reaction to medication. Third seeded Louisville forced 27 turnovers in a win over Liberty.

Second round
Fourth seeded Vanderbilt beat fifth seeded Kansas State behind a career-high 27 points by Jennifer Risper, and 24 points by Christina Wirth. Kansas State held a one-point lead at halftime, but Vanderbilt scored eleven consecutive points in a second half run to take a lead they would not relinquish.

Second seeded Baylor beats South Dakota State on a last second shot. Kelli Griffin scored with 0.5 seconds remaining in the game to break a 58–58 tie, and move the Bears into the regional semi-final.

Marissa Coleman has 18 points and 18 rebounds to lead top seeded Maryland over Utah on their home floor. Over ten thousand fans watched Maryland win its 35th consecutive game at home.

Third seeded Louisville beat LSU on LSU's home floor. LSU had won twelve consecutive victories on their home floor. LSU's will not advance to the Final Four, ending an NCAA record-tying streak of five consecutive appearances. The win was the 31st of the year for Louisville, a school record.

Regional semifinals (Sweet Sixteen)
Three seed Louisville holds two seed Baylor to 39 points, in a surprisingly easy upset. Both Angel McCoughtry and Candyce Bingham had double-doubles to help lead the Cardinals to the first regional championship game in school history.

Top seed Maryland survived a challenge from fourth seeded Vanderbilt. The Commodores started strong with an opening 12–2, which they extended to a 33–15 margin with six minutes left in the first half. Vanderbilt's Christina Wirth had a career-high 28 points, but it wasn't enough as Maryland's Marissa Coleman scored 42. Coleman scored the basket to give Maryland the lead with just under 30 seconds left in the game, and the clinching free throws.

Regional final (Elite Eight)
Third seeded Louisville knocks off top-seeded Maryland to head to their first ever Final Four. Angel McCoughtry had a double-double to lead the Cardinals to the win. Maryland hurt themselves with 21 turnovers. Louisville head coach Jeff Walz was a former assistant coach of Maryland.

Trenton Region

First round
Fifth seed Virginia trailed at halftime, but came back to beat Marist. Sixth seeded Arizona State beat Georgia, despite playing without injured Dymond Simon. Third seeded Florida State had five players in double figure, helping win over North Carolina A&T. Fourth seeded California beats Fresno State. Top seed Connecticut easily beat Vermont behind Tina Charles's 32 points on 13–14 from the field.

Eighth seeded Florida beats Temple for its 24th win of the year, tying a school record. Second seeded Texas A&M forces 30 turnovers in a win over Evansville. 
Tenth seeded Minnesota upsets Notre Dame.

Second round
Sixth seeded Arizona State's Danielle Orsillo hit a three-pointer with 32 seconds left to break a 54–54 tie. ASU hung on to upset third seeded Florida State.

Fourth seeded California won easily over fifth seeded Virginia. Ashley Walker tied a career high with 32 points, while Devanei Hampton and Alexis Gray-Lawson each added 22 points.

Second seeded Texas A&M beat tenth seeded Minnesota behind a season-high 20 steals. The Aggies forced 32 turnovers to beat the Gophers by 31.

Top seeded Connecticut beat eighth seeded Florida. Renee Montgomery, playing on her home court for the last time in her career, scored 25. The win moves Connecticut in the Sweet Sixteen for the 16th consecutive time, the longest active streak.

Regional semifinals (Sweet Sixteen)
Connecticut faced their largest deficit of the year (eight points) against California, and went into halftime with only a two-point margin. UConn outscored California by 40–12, starting at the time of the eight-point deficit, to take control of the game. UConn's Tiffany Hayes had a career-high 28 points, shooting 9–10 from the field, including 5–6 from beyond the three-point arc.

Sixth seeded Arizona State upsets two seed Texas A&M. Briann January and Danielle Orsillo were both perfect from the floor, helping the Sun Devils to a season-high 62 percent shooting percentage. The Texas &M team was also shooting well, hitting 55% of their first 29 shots. They were within three as late as 7:12 left in the game, but ASU outscored them and ended with a fifteen-point margin.

Regional final (Elite Eight)
Top-seeded Connecticut beat Arizona State to advance to their tenth Final Four. The game was close early – UConn led at one point 20–19, but UConn went on a 9–2 run to open up the margin. After a score by ASU, Maya Moore scored the next five points, which broke the single-season scoring record held by Kara Wolters. Kara was sitting courtside, doing commentary for a Connecticut radio station. The Sun Devils got to within eight at one point in the second half, but Moore and Montgomery combined for eight consecutive points to stretch the lead to 16. ASU would not get within double digits again.

Final Four
Two very different games in terms of Final Four experience. In the first game, Oklahoma is in only its second Final Four (the first in 2002) and Louisville is making its first ever Final Four.

Only four coaches in NCAA history have multiple NCAA championships, and two of them, Tara VanDerveer and Geno Auriemma, coach the second game.

Louisville versus Oklahoma

Louisville plays the role of newcomer to the Final Four by missing its first 13 shots. Over seven minutes into the game, Louisville has taken their second full timeout, has yet to hit a basket, and is losing 16–2. Louisville shook off the opening jitters and began scoring. Just after the final media timeout of the first half, two Angel McCoughtry free throws would cut the lead to six, but Oklahoma would outscore Louisville 10–4 to take a twelve-point lead into the half.

The second half would open up almost a mirror image of the first half. Louisville outscored Oklahoma 15–1 to take their first lead. Oklahoma did not get a basket until more than seven minutes had elapsed. The game would stay close from then on, with never more than a six-point margin by either team. With 18 seconds left in the game Courtney Paris would hit a basket to bring the margin to one. After Candyce Bingham hit one of two free throws, Nyeshia Stevenson took a three-point shot with two seconds left in the game. Her shot rimmed out, and Louisville hung on to win 61–59.

Stanford versus Connecticut
Connecticut entered the game having won its last 37 games, but their opponent Stanford was the last team to have beaten them. Just over nine minutes into the game, Stanford led 14–13. Jayne Appel scored ten of Stanford's 14 points, and assisted on one of the other two baskets. Then Renee Montgomery scored nine of UConn's next eleven points and assisted on the other basket in the stretch. Maya Moore added five points, part of an 18–4 run to bring the score to 31–18. Connecticut entered the halftime break with a 13-point lead, one more than they had had the last time they had played a Final Four game in St. Louis: a 2001 game in which, despite the large halftime lead, Notre Dame went to win the game and the Championship.

This time was different however. Connecticut scored the first eleven points of the second half, to double up Stanford 48–24. Connecticut led by at least 20 until the last five minutes and won 81–64. Jayne Appel matched Renee Montgomery for high scoring honors with 26, but Connecticut also got 24 from Maya Moore.

Championship game – Louisville versus Connecticut

Louisville would meet Connecticut for the third time in the season, but it would be the first ever all Big East Championship game. UConn prevailed in the first meeting by 28 points, and won by 39 in the Big East Tournament Championship game.

Angel McCoughtry tried to change the outcome this time, scoring eleven of Louisville's first 15 points, and assisting on two others, to take a 15–13 lead just over eight minutes into the game. UConn began feeding Tina Charles, who helped pull them to a 14-point lead 39–24, at halftime.

Tina would end the game with 25 points, 19 rebounds, and a trophy for the Most Outstanding Player of the Tournament. Connecticut hit 50% of their field goal tries, holding Louisville to just under 31%.

Connecticut won 76–54, winning its sixth National Championship, and completing its third perfect season. They would win every game by double digits for the first time in NCAA history.

Brackets

Results to date

* – Denotes overtime period

Trenton Regional – Trenton, New Jersey

Berkeley Regional – Berkeley, California

Raleigh Regional – Raleigh, North Carolina

Oklahoma City Regional – Oklahoma City

Final Four – St. Louis, Missouri

Record by conference

Nineteen conferences went 0-1: America East, Atlantic Sun Conference, Big Sky Conference, Big South Conference, Big West Conference, Conference USA, Horizon League, Ivy League, MAAC, MEAC, Missouri Valley Conference, Northeast Conference, Ohio Valley Conference, Patriot League, Southern Conference, Southland, Sun Belt Conference, SWAC, and WAC

All-Tournament Team

 Tina Charles, Connecticut
 Maya Moore, Connecticut
 Renee Montgomery, Connecticut
 Angel McCoughtry, Louisville
 Jayne Appel, Stanford

Game officials

 Tina Napier(semifinal)
 Cameron Inouye (semifinal)
 Lisa Jones (semifinal)
 Eric Brewton (semifinal)
 Melissa Barlows (semifinal)
 Felicia Grinter (semifinal)
 Dee Kantner (final)
 Lisa Mattingly (final)
 Clarke Stevens (final)

See also
 2009 NCAA Division II women's basketball tournament
 2009 NCAA Division III women's basketball tournament
 2009 NAIA Division I women's basketball tournament
 2009 NAIA Division II women's basketball tournament
 2009 NCAA Division I men's basketball tournament

References

External links
 NCAA official site

NCAA Division I women's basketball tournament
NCAA Division I women's basketball tournament
NCAA Division I women's basketball tournament
UConn Huskies women's basketball
Louisville Cardinals women's basketball
Basketball competitions in Lubbock, Texas
Basketball competitions in St. Louis
Women's sports in Missouri
College sports tournaments in Missouri